Gordon Wallace (born 13 June 1944 in Lanark) is a Scottish former footballer, who played for Liverpool during the 1960s.

Career
Wallace was raised in Wales after his father Dougie, also a footballer, transferred to Llanelli Town in 1949. Gordon attended school with future rugby union star Barry John and had trials with Huddersfield Town while Bill Shankly was the Yorkshire club's manager. Shankly moved to Liverpool in late 1959, and soon brought in the teenage Wallace as an apprentice.

During his spell at Anfield, his main claims to fame were netting the opening goal in the 1964 FA Charity Shield, scoring twice in a match covered on the very first BBC "Match of the Day" programme, and being Liverpool's first ever European Champions' Cup goalscorer (the first goal in an away tie against KR Reykjavík), all occurring in August 1964.

Despite such a promising start his first team opportunities were limited by the consistency, fitness and excellent disciplinary records of Liverpool's twin strike force, Roger Hunt and Ian St John, respectively England and Scotland internationals. Wallace played for Liverpool Reserves between 1965 and 1967. When Tony Hateley joined Liverpool in 1967, Wallace left on a free transfer, joining Crewe Alexandra.

He shone at Crewe and was an important element of the team that won promotion to Division 3 in the 1967–68 season. His form the following season began to attract interest from higher league sides until a home game versus Watford on 28 September 1968, when a tackle from behind broke his leg. It took him 13 months to return to first team football, but he never managed to regain the form of old. He played his final game for Crewe away at Colchester on 17 September 1972. Wallace scored 20 goals in 94 league appearances for Crewe.

Honours
Liverpool
Charity Shield: 1964 (Shared)

Crewe Alexandra
Football League Fourth Division fourth-place promotion: 1967–68

References

1944 births
Living people
Sportspeople from Lanark
Sportspeople from Carmarthenshire
Scottish footballers
Association football inside forwards
Liverpool F.C. players
Crewe Alexandra F.C. players
English Football League players
Scottish people of South African descent
Footballers from South Lanarkshire